"Love to Go" is a song by Belgian DJ Lost Frequencies, Dutch Electronic music trio Zonderling & British–Zimbabwean singer-songwriter Kelvin Jones. It was released as a single through Found Frequencies and Armada Music on 17 April 2020. The song was written by Martijn van Sonderen, Felix De Laet, Daniel Flamm, Patrick Salmy, Jaap de Vries, Ricardo Muñoz, Molly Irvine and Tinashe Kelvin Mupani.

Charts

Weekly charts

Year-end charts

Release history

References

2020 singles
2020 songs
Lost Frequencies songs
Songs written by Lost Frequencies